Brink Productions is an Australian theatre company based in Adelaide, specialising in the ensemble-development of new writing.

History
Brink was established in 1996 as a collective of seven actors, primarily graduates from the drama school of Flinders University, in order to "improve artistic production" in Australian theatre. Brink's founding members were Michaela Cantwell, Michaela Coventry, Lizzy Falkland, Victoria Hill, Richard Kelly, David Mealor, John Molloy and Paul Moore, joined soon after by director Benedict Andrews. Director Chris Drummond was appointed artistic director in 2004.

One of Brink's most successful collaborations was When The Rain Stops Falling, written by Andrew Bovell with designs by visual artist Hossein Valamanesh and music by Quentin Grant. During 2008-2010 the Brink cast performed the play to over 60,000 people in Adelaide (2008, 2010), Sydney Theatre Company (2009), Melbourne Theatre Company (2009), Queensland Theatre Company (2010), Canberra Theatre Centre (2010) and the Araluen Arts Centre, Alice Springs (2010). The script has been performed all over the world including seasons at the Almeida Theatre in London and the Lincoln Center in New York City.

In 2016–17, Brink worked in association with Far & Away Productions to produce Ancient Rain, created with songwriter Paul Kelly, singer Camille O'Sullivan and musician Feargal Murray. The theatrical song cycle featured the poems of Seamus Heaney, James Joyce, Patrick Kavanagh, Paula Meehan, Padraic Pearse and WB Yeats and was presented at the 2016 Dublin Theatre Festival, 2016 Melbourne Festival, Canberra Theatre Centre, Merrigoing Theatre, 2017 Dark Mofo, QPAC and the 2017 Adelaide Cabaret Festival.

In 2018, Brink premiered Memorial at the 2018 Adelaide Festival, before touring it to the 2018 Brisbane Festival and the Barbican Centre. Memorial was a stage adaptation of Alice Oswald's Memorial: An Excavation of the Iliad, with music by Jocelyn Pook. Staged as a theatrical soliloquy performed by Helen Morse, it featured 200 chorus members 

In 2018, the also company toured The Aspirations of Daise Morrow to Canberra Theatre Centre, Merrigong Theatre, the 2018 Galway Festival and the Assembly Rooms at the 2018 Edinburgh Fringe. The Aspirations of Daise Morrow is Brink's adaptation of Patrick White's short story Down at the Dump, from The Burnt Ones.

Brink has worked with a broad array of artists, including Benedict Andrews, Howard Barker, Paul Blackwell, Andrew Bovell, Kate Box, Geordie Brookman, Paul Capsis, Geoff Cobham, Robert Cousins, Cameron Goodall, Lenny Grigoryan, and Slava Grigoryan.

Productions
Brink's repertoire of work includes "epic narrative, re-imagined classics, music theatre and children's theatre".

Past productions include:
Memorial by Alice Oswald, Music by Jocelyn Pook, directed by Chris Drummond - World Premiere at the 2018 Adelaide Festival;
Ancient Rain by Paul Kelly & Camille O'Sullivan with Feargal Murray, directed by Chris Drummond - World Premiere at the Adelaide Cabaret Festival;
Long Tan by Verity Laughton, directed by Chris Drummond accompanied by AD Exhibition Ripples of Wartime created by filmmaker Malcolm McKinnon;
Gone Viral by Sally Hardy, directed by Tiffany Lyndall-Knight (Free Range Theatre in association with Brink, presented by the 2017 DreamBIG Festival);
Tartuffe, an adaptation of Molière's play, by Philip Kavanagh, directed by Chris Drummond, with the State Theatre Company of South Australia;
Deluge by Philip Kavanagh, directed by Nescha Jelj, 2016 Adelaide Festival;
The Aspirations of Daise Morrow, adapted from a short story by Patrick White, directed by Chris Drummond, Space Theatre & tour to Canberra, Wollongong, Galway and Edinburgh; 
Stories I Want to Tell You in Person by Lally Katz, directed by Anne-Louise Sarks, Bakehouse Theatre;
The Dissolving Self, devised by Chris Drummond, Susan Rogers and NIDA at Carriageworks;
Thursday by Bryony Lavery, directed by Chris Drummond in a collaboration with English Touring Theatre (based on the story of Gill Hicks who lost her legs in the 7/7/2005 London bombings);
Land &Sea by Nicki Bloom, directed by Chris Drummond, Old Queens Theatre, Adelaide;
Skip Miller's Hit Songs by Sean Riley, directed by Chris Drummond, Odeon Theatre;
Harbinger by Matthew Whittet, directed by Chris Drummond, Space Theatre;
The Hypochondriac by Moliere, a new adaptation by Paul Galloway, directed by Chris Drummond, Space Theatre; 
When the Rain Stops Falling by Andrew Bovell (A collaboration with Hossein Valamanesh and Brink), directed by Chris Drummond - Premiered at 2008 Adelaide Festival, touring to Sydney, Melbourne, Brisbane, Canberra and Alice Springs;
The Clockwork Forest by Doug Macleod, directed by Chris Drummond, with Windmill Theatre - Dunstan Playhouse and Sydney Theatre Company;
This Uncharted Hour by Finegan Kruckemeyer, directed by Chris Drummond, with The Firm and State Theatre Company of South Australia;
Drums in the Night adapted from the Bertolt Brecht, by Finegan Kruckemeyer, directed by Chris Drummond, with State Theatre Company of South Australia;
4:48 Psychosis by Sarah Kane, directed by Geordie Brookman, Old Queen's Theatre
The Duckshooter by Marty Denniss, directed by Michael Hill, with the State Theatre Company of South Australia;
The Caretaker by Harold Pinter, directed by Hannah MacDougall, presented by Belvoir Street Theatre and Adelaide Fringe;
Killer Joe by Tracy Letts, directed by Hannah MacDougall, presented by Adelaide Fringe and State Theatre Company of South Australia;
A Lie of the Mind by Sam Shepard, directed by Tim Maddock, Space Theatre;
Blue Remembered Hills by Dennis Potter, Belvoir Street Theatre and Space Theatre;
Ursula by Howard Barker, directed by Tim Maddock, Space Theatre;
Quartet by Heiner Muller, directed by Gerrard McArthur, Old Queens Theatre, Adelaide
The Ecstatic Bible by Howard Barker, directed by Howard Barker and Tim Maddock with The Wrestling School at the 2000 Adelaide Festival;
A Dream Play by August Strindberg, directed by Benedict Andrews, Odeon Theatre;
Mojo by Jez Butterworth, directed by Benedict Andrews, Adelaide Fringe and Red Shed Theatre;
Roberto Zucco by Bernard Marie Koltes, directed by Tim Maddock, Balcony Theatre;
The Europeans by Howard Barker, directed by Tim Maddock, Balcony Theatre & Wharf 2 Theatre;
The Misanthrope by Moliere, directed by Tim Maddock, Balcony Theatre;
The Dumb Waiter by Harold Pinter, directed by Gina Tsikouras, Red Shed Theatre & The Old Fitzroy Hotel;
[Uncle] Vanya by Howard Barker, directed by Tim Maddock, Red Shed Theatre & Belvoir Street Theatre

Awards

 2018: Memorial Adelaide Critics Circle Award - Best Group
 2017: Long Tan Curtain Call Award - Best Design
 2015: The Aspirations of Daise Morrow Adelaide Critics Circle Award - Best Group
 2013: Thursday Curtain Call Award - Best Ensemble
 2011: Skip Miller's Hit Songs by Sean Riley Adelaide Fringe - John Chataway Digital Technology Award
 2010: When the Rain Stops Falling by Andrew Bovell, a collaboration with Hossein Valamanesh & Brink Productions - ACT Green Room Award - Production
 2009: The Hypochondriac by Molière, a new adaptation by Paul Galloway (Brink Productions, producer) - Adelaide Critics' Circle Award - Group Prize 
 2008: When the Rain Stops Falling, a collaboration with Hossein Valamanesh & Brink Productions, presented with the State Theatre Company of South Australia and the Adelaide Festival of Arts
Adelaide Critics' Circle Award – Group Prize (Brink Productions, producer);
Adelaide Critics' Circle Award – Individual Prize(Andrew Bovell, playwright;
Ruby Award - Best Work or Event;
Curtain Call Awards – Best Drama & Best Technical for Set Design/Video Design & Projection;
Victorian Premier's 2008 Literary Awards (Louis Esson Prize for Drama;
Queensland Premier's 2008 Literary Awards (Drama Script – Stage - Award;
Oscarts 2008 – Best of Everything;

2006: This Uncharted Hour by Finegan Kruckemeyer, co-production with the STCSA, presented in association with The Firm and the Adelaide Festival Centre's Inspace - ArtsSA: Jill Blewett Playwright's Award

2005: Drums in the Night by Bertolt Brecht, translated by Finegan Kruckemeyer, co-production with STCSA - Adelaide Theatre Guide Curtain Call Awards: Best Show, Drama
2001: Killer Joe by Tracy Letts -The Advertiser: Oscart for Best Production
2000: The Ecstatic Bible by Howard Barker, a co-production with The Wrestling School - Adelaide Critics' Circle: Excellence in Arts
 1998: The Dumb Waiter by Harold Pinter -The Advertiser: Overall Artistic Excellence, Adelaide Fringe Festival
1998 Mojo The Advertiser: Overall Artistic Excellence, Adelaide Fringe Festival
 1996: (Uncle) Vanya by Howard Barker -Adelaide Critics' Circle: Best Production

References

External links

Performing arts in Adelaide
Theatre companies in Australia